Artashes Arakelian (1909 – November 10, 1993) was an economist, member of the Armenian Academy of Sciences (1960). Artashes chaired the Regional Planning Division of NKAR, he also worked as a researcher at Moscow Economy Institute. Later he headed to the Economy Institute of the Academy. He has authored numerous researches. Arakelian has an international reputation as an economist.

1909 births
1993 deaths
20th-century economists
Azerbaijan State University of Economics alumni
Academic staff of Yerevan State University
Recipients of the Order of Friendship of Peoples
Recipients of the Order of the Red Banner of Labour
Armenian economists
Armenian scientists